Ibiranu (reigned  1235 BC –  1225/20 BC) was the sixth king of Ugarit, a city-state in northwestern Syria. Ibiranu reigned between c. 1235 and 1225/20 BC, and was a contemporary of Tudhaliya IV and Arnuwanda III of Hatti. As a vassal state of Hatti the king was answerable to the viceroy at Carchemish.

References

Citations

Bibliography

Ugaritic kings
1220s BC deaths
13th-century BC rulers
Year of birth unknown
13th-century BC people